National Research Council may refer to:

 National Research Council (Canada), sponsoring research and development
 National Research Council (Italy), scientific and technological research, Rome
 National Research Council (United States), part of the U.S. National Academy of Sciences and U.S. National Academy of Engineering
 National Scientific and Technical Research Council, Argentine government agency which directs scientific research in universities and institutes

See also
 National Council of Educational Research and Training, India